Castile or Castille is a surname. Notable people with the surname include:

 Castile:
Brooke Castile (born 1986), American pairs figure skater
 Christopher Castile (born 1980), American actor
 L. J. Castile (born 1987), American football player
 Philando Castile (19832016), American man fatally shot by a police officer in St. Anthony, Minnesota

 Castille:
 Hadley Castille (19332012), Cajun fiddler
 Simeon Castille (born 1985), NFL cornerback

See also 

 Emilio J. Castilla, Spanish academic
 Javier Castilla (born 1981), Colombian professional squash player
 Vinny Castilla (born 1967), Mexican professional baseball player

French-language surnames